Pierre de Rivaz (17111772) was a French clockmaker of the 18th century, from Saint-Gingolph. He built a clock in 1740 that was powered by variations in air temperature and pressure, a type of Atmos clock.

See also 
Marine chronometer

References 

French clockmakers
1711 births
1772 deaths